The 1942–43 Chicago Black Hawks season was the team's 17th season in the National Hockey League, and they were coming off a 4th-place finish in 1941–42, and lost to the Boston Bruins in the opening round of the playoffs.  The NHL would lose another team, as the Brooklyn Americans would fold, leaving the league with only 6 clubs.  The league also increased its schedule from 48 games to 50.  With World War II going on, every team in the league would lose some players who left to fight in the war.

Black Hawks general manager Frederic McLaughlin, who had been the GM since the Black Hawks entered the league in 1926, retired before the season began, and Bill Tobin was hired to take over.

The Black Hawks would finish just under .500, as they had a 17–18–15 record, good for 49 points and 5th place in the standings, missing the playoffs for the first time in 4 years.  Chicago would score a club record 179 goals, which was the 4th highest in the league, however, they also allowed a team record 180 goals, the 3rd highest total in the league.  Chicago would have a very strong home record, going 14–3–8, but would win only 3 road games, and miss the playoffs by a single point.

Doug Bentley would become the first Black Hawk to lead the NHL in scoring, as he set team records in goals (33) and points (73), while younger brother Max Bentley would set a team record with 44 assists, and finished with 70 points, and won the Lady Byng Trophy, as he would record only 2 penalty minutes all season long.  Red Hamill had a strong season, scoring 28 goals.  Earl Seibert once again led the defense, earning 32 points and had a club high 48 penalty minutes.

In goal, the Hawks acquired Bert Gardiner from the Montreal Canadiens before the season began, due to Sam LoPresti leaving the team to fight in the war, and Gardiner would win 17 games, posting a 3.58 GAA and had a shutout.

Season standings

Record vs. opponents

Game log

Regular season

Season stats

Scoring leaders

Goaltending

References 
 SHRP Sports
 The Internet Hockey Database
 National Hockey League Guide & Record Book 2007

Chicago Blackhawks seasons
Chicago
Chicago